The Sperling Building (also known as the Mercantile Building) located at 1007–1013 Penn Avenue in Wilkinsburg, Pennsylvania, was built for John Sperling in 1902.  It was added to the National Register of Historic Places on May 10, 2005.

References

Commercial buildings on the National Register of Historic Places in Pennsylvania
Buildings and structures in Allegheny County, Pennsylvania
Commercial buildings completed in 1902
National Register of Historic Places in Allegheny County, Pennsylvania